Nadejda Danilina (sometimes spelled Nedezdha Danilinia) (Novouralsk, 17 February 1967) is a Soviet luger who competed in the late 1980s. Competing in two Winter Olympics, she earned her best finish of eighth in the women's singles event at Calgary in 1988. Danilina was married to Sergey Danilin, who won the silver medal in the men's singles luge event at the 1984 Winter Olympics in Sarajevo.

References
1988 luge women's singles results
1992 luge women's singles results
New York Times November 16, 1987 article featuring Danilina

External links
 

Living people
Lugers at the 1988 Winter Olympics
Lugers at the 1992 Winter Olympics
Russian female lugers
Soviet female lugers
Year of birth missing (living people)
Olympic lugers of the Soviet Union
Olympic lugers of the Unified Team
People from Novouralsk
Sportspeople from Sverdlovsk Oblast